The Line, LLP is an independent animation studio based in London, England. Specializing in 2D animation, The Line was founded in 2013 by a team of six animators; Sam Taylor, Wesley Louis, Bjorn-Erik Aschim, James Duveen, Max Taylor, and Tim McCourt. The studio have produced advertisements for a number of brands and produced music videos for bands such as Gorillaz and N.A.S.A.

Overview
The Line’s first film together was the animated short ‘’Everything I Can See From Here’’, which was nominated for a British Short Animation BAFTA award in 2014. The studio is best known for its work with the British virtual band Gorillaz and producing the band’s 2020 web series Song Machine and the music video for Humility in 2018. The studio are also behind the music video for the song Giants by True Damage, another virtual band created for the video game League of Legends. In 2013 they also produced the official music video for the single "Easy" by Porter Robinson and Mat Zo. They have also produced advertisements for various brands including Nickelodeon, Virgin Media, Gucci, Doritos, Viceland, Freeview, YT Izzo, and others.

History
The Line began in 2013 when the founders rented a studio in East London to work on their material. The first time that all six founders worked on a project together was the music video for the single “Easy” by Porter Robinson and Mat Zo. After being satisfied with the experience and its result, the group decided to continue working together as a collective. The Line’s first short film, ‘’Everything I Can See From Here’’ was nominated for a BAFTA Award for British Short Animation in 2014 and the exposure from the nomination was followed by a series of opportunities and offers for collaborations from various brands.

Filmography

Web series
 ‘’Song Machine’’

Music Videos

Advertisements
 E4 (TV channel) “E4 Man” 2011
 Game of Thrones “Blinkbox” 2014
 Freeview “Set Yourself Free” 2014
 STV1 “Ramadan” 2014
 HSBC “Charged Up” 2015
 YouTube “A-Z of Youtube” 2015
 Virgin Media “9.58 Seconds” 2016
 Doritos “Doritos Collisions” 2018
 Gucci “Gucci SS2018” 2018
 Blizzard Entertainment “Heroes of the Storm - MechaStorm” 2018
 Chucklefish “Wargroove” 2019
 Unilever “Every U Does Good” 2019
 YT Izzo “YT IZZO: FAST・AGILE・SHARP” 2020
 Sanrio “Hello Kitty” 2020
 Riot Games “Worlds 2020 - League of Legends” 2020
 Kenzo “The Great Race” 2020
 TBS “TBS Idents”
 Red Bull “Zenit”
 Nickelodeon “Vines”

Awards
LAMVF Best Animated Video
BAFTA British Short Animation 2014 (nomination)

References

External links
 The Line's website
 The Line's Vimeo page

British animation studios
British companies established in 2013
2013 establishments in England